"Suddenly" is a duet performed by Olivia Newton-John and Cliff Richard from the soundtrack Xanadu, and is the love theme from the 1980 film of the same name. It was written and produced by John Farrar.

"Suddenly" reached number 15 on the UK Singles Chart in October 1980 and number 20 on the US Billboard Hot 100 in January 1981.  It finished the year as number 91 on the Billboard Year-End Hot 100 Singles of 1981. It was also a major Adult Contemporary hit, reaching number four. The music video shows Newton-John and Richard in a penthouse singing the song to each other, taken from her ABC TV special "Hollywood Nights" that aired before the 52nd Academy Awards on April 14, 1980.

The single's B-side, "You Made Me Love You" (Olivia solo), was also featured in the film Xanadu but does not appear on the soundtrack album.

Personnel
 Olivia Newton-John – vocals
 Cliff Richard – vocals
 John Farrar – guitar and synthesizer
 David McDaniel – bass
 Ed Greene – drums
 Michael Boddicker – vocoder
 Jai Winding – electric piano
 Richard Hewson – orchestra conductor

Track listing and formats
7-inch vinyl single
 "Suddenly" – 4:03
 "You Made Me Love You" (Olivia Newton-John) – 3:04

Charts

Weekly charts

Cover versions
The song was covered by Filipino singers Sam Milby and Toni Gonzaga on their debut studio album Love Duets (2009).

References

1980 singles
1980 songs
Olivia Newton-John songs
Cliff Richard songs
Jet Records singles
Love themes
Male–female vocal duets
Songs from Xanadu (film)
Song recordings produced by John Farrar
Songs written by John Farrar
MCA Records singles